is the 19th single by the Japanese girl idol group Berryz Kobo. It was released in Japan on March 11, 2009, and debuted at number 8 in the weekly Oricon singles chart.

Track listings

CD single 
 
 
 "Dakishimete Dakishimete" (Instrumental)

 Limited Edition DVD
 "Dakishimete Dakishimete" (Close-up Ver.)

DVD single "Dakishimete Dakishimete" Single V 
 "Dakishimete Dakishimete"
 "Dakishimete Dakishimete" (Dance Shot Ver.)

DVD single "Dakishimete Dakishimete" Event V

Charts

References

External links 
 Profile on the Up-Front Works official website
 Profile of the corresponding DVD single on the Up-Front Works official website

2009 singles
2009 songs
Japanese-language songs
Berryz Kobo songs
Songs written by Tsunku
Piccolo Town singles
Japanese synth-pop songs
Electronic dance music songs